Tun Fuad Stephens Park is a recreational park in Bukit Padang, Kota Kinabalu, Sabah, Malaysia. It is built in honour of the late Chief Minister of Sabah Fuad Stephens who perished in the Double Six Tragedy in 1976.

Features 
The park features a 2.1 kilometres asphalt jogging path with various trees species surrounding the park along with a man-made lake. The park also previously features a seafood restaurant, hawker centre, event halls and a water theme park (Closed).

Accessibility 
The access to the park are free from any charges with parking spaces available.

See also 
 List of parks and gardens in Malaysia

References 

Kota Kinabalu
Parks in Malaysia